Taranes is one of nine parishes (administrative divisions) in Ponga, a municipality within the province and autonomous community of Asturias, in northern Spain.

The population is 69 (INE 2007).

Villages and hamlets
 Tanda 
 Taranes
 Valle del Moro

References

Parishes in Ponga